Anastasia Borisovna Fomina (born 5 August 1983) is a retired Russian basketball point guard. She won the EuroCup in 2004 with Baltic Star and in 2012 with Dynamo Kursk.

References

1983 births
Living people
Russian women's basketball players
Point guards